Lake Mainit is the fourth largest lake in the Philippines, having a surface area of . The lake is also the deepest lake in the country with maximum depth reaching .  It is located in the northeastern section of Mindanao and shared between the provinces of Surigao del Norte and Agusan del Norte.

Etymology
The name of the lake is a Visayan word mainit, which means "hot".

Flora and fauna

Plants
 Fire orchid (Vanda hookeriana)
 Narra tree (Pterocarpus indicus)
 Molave tree (Vitex parviflora)
 Philippine rosewood or "toog"
 Kamagong 
 Mancono
 Malabayabas (Eucalyptus spp.)
 Indian lotus (Nelumbo nucifera)

Animals
 Animals
 Mindanao scops owl
 Mindanao savanna nightjar
 Mindanao Himalayan swiftlet
 Mindanao forest kingfisher
 White-breasted sea eagle (Haliaeetus leucogaster)
 Monkeys
 Wild pigs

 Fish
 "Casili" (Anguilla spp.)
 Mudfish, "hayuan" or "halwan" (Channa striata)
 Gurami (Gourami belontiidae)
 "Bolinao" (Neostethus thessa)
 Common carp (Cyprinus carpio)
 "Tilapia" (Oreochromis niloticus)

List

Municipalities bordering the lake
 Mainit, Surigao del Norte
 Alegria, Surigao del Norte
 Jabonga, Agusan del Norte
 Kitcharao, Agusan del Norte

Municipalities within Lake Mainit's watershed

 Alegria, Surigao del Norte,
 Sison, Surigao del Norte
 Tubod, Surigao del Norte
 Mainit, Surigao del Norte
 Kitcharao, Agusan del Norte
 Jabonga, Agusan del Norte
 Santiago, Agusan del Norte
 Tubay, Agusan del Norte

References

Further reading
 A Directory of Philippine Wetlands. Vol I, compiled by Davies, J. et al. (Asian Wetland Bureau Philippines Foundation, Inc, 1991)
 Webpage on Lake Minit (cited part available online)

External links

 Lake Mainit Updates
 Lake Mainit Development Alliance
 LMDA Updates

 
Mainit